Black Dawn is a helicopter-combat simulation, published by Virgin Interactive Entertainment. It was released on the Sony PlayStation in 1996, and the Sega Saturn in 1997.

Plot
Set in 1998, the player controls a helicopter ace recruited into a black ops counterterrorism strike force named Operation Black Dawn. The player pilots the agile AH-69 Mohawk, an advanced combat helicopter with a powerful arsenal of weaponry.

Gameplay
The game consists of seven campaigns that take place in different areas, and each campaign has a number of different missions. In addition to search-and-destroy objectives, there are hostages that require saving. The game has drawn comparisons with Soviet Strike, another helicopter simulator released in the same year. However, Black Dawn resembles an arcade game rather than a typical simulator, not least because various power-ups are obtained from destroyed enemies.

A two-player deathmatch mode is included, but can only be accessed via a cheat code.

Development
Lead programmer Will Botti cited Choplifter as an inspiration for the game.

The game uses the same engine as Agile Warrior, Black Ops Entertainment's previous game.

The soundtrack was originally composed by Todd Dennis.

Reception

Black Dawn received generally positive reviews. Critics praised the intense gameplay with numerous targets, the orchestral music, and the clean, detailed graphics, though some criticized the heavy use of distance fog and the blocky ground textures. Some also remarked that the complex controls take time to get used to. However, nearly all were left with an overall positive impression; GameSpot assessed it as "what loud, engaging gameplay is all about", Next Generation called it "a pleasing combination of excellent graphics and dead-on game play", Sega Saturn Magazine summarized it as "A top 3D shoot 'em up that's initially difficult to get to grips with, but ultimately is a very fine game indeed", and Air Hendrix of GamePro concluded, "A few flaws aside, Black Dawn is a well-rounded game that delivers riveting, adrenaline-packed combat." Electronic Gaming Monthly named it a runner-up for Flying Game of the Year (behind Pilotwings 64).

Air Hendrix called the Saturn version "an impressive, exact port of the PlayStation game", but went on to say that the graphics are not as clean and the control configuration is not as intuitive.

References

External links
Black Dawn at MobyGames

1996 video games
Combat flight simulators
Helicopter video games
PlayStation (console) games
Sega Saturn games
Video games about terrorism
Video games developed in the United States
Video games scored by Tommy Tallarico
Video games set in 1998
Virgin Interactive games
Black Ops Entertainment games
Single-player video games